The Voodoo Factor is a 1959-1960 British television drama mini-series. It consisted of six half-hour episodes and was written by Lewis Griefer.

Cast members included Maurice Kaufmann, Maxine Audley and Jill Hyem who later went on to write and create many TV series herself. Hyem remembers being afraid of the real spiders used in the production and the fact that during recording Griefer had still not decided if her character, Alice Simms, would die or not.

Unlike many other British series of the 1950s, the series survives intact. It was produced by Associated Television (ATV).

References

See also
Five Names for Johnny
The Gentle Killers
The Man Who Finally Died
Motive for Murder

1959 British television series debuts
1960 British television series endings
1950s British drama television series
1960s British drama television series
1950s British television miniseries
1960s British television miniseries
Black-and-white British television shows
English-language television shows
ITV television dramas
Television series by ITV Studios
Television shows produced by Associated Television (ATV)
British fantasy television series